Ľubomír Lipták (1930 – 2003)  was a Slovak historian.

References

Further reading

1930 births
2003 deaths
20th-century Slovak historians
Historians of Slovakia